Hostelling Scotland (SYHA; Gaelic: Comann Osdailean Òigridh na h-Alba) is part of Hostelling International and provides youth hostel accommodation in Scotland.  the organisation represents 58 hostels: 31 run by Hostelling Scotland and 27 affiliates.

History
The organisation was founded in 1931 as the Scottish Youth Hostels Association (SYHA).

In 1938, there were more than 60 hostels and membership was approaching 20,000. At its peak, the SYHA had 99 hostels; by 1995 this had reduced to 85.

In 2013, around 60% of guests came from outwith Scotland.

As of 2016, the hostel guide and website lists over 60 hostels, 28 of which are independently owned affiliate hostels such as those of the Gatliff Hebridean Hostel Trust and various local communities and authorities. Hostels vary from modern purpose-built premises to historic buildings and country cottages, sited in major towns and cities and in rural locations, including remote islands.

Accommodation is generally dormitory-style but increasingly this is being subdivided into smaller units. For example, the most modern hostel, Edinburgh Central, has many single and twin-bedded rooms with ensuite facilities. All have a lounge, shared bathrooms and self-catering kitchens. Many hostels provide meals at request.

Hostelling Scotland is a self-funding charitable organisation, and as a not-for-profit business invests all surplus back into the organisation, both to develop the network and to improve older hostels. Today it faces competition from the more numerous independent hostels, and from rural hotels which provide bunkhouse accommodation.

It has been claimed that it has left its roots as a working class movement to "provide accommodation to people of limited means" behind, and become too expensive. The SYHA's defenders, including Allan Wilson MSP, point out that hostellers today require higher levels of comfort than when the hostelling movement began.

The organisation later became SYHA Hostelling Scotland, then in 2018, the organisation rebranded as Hostelling Scotland, dropping the SYHA from their name.

References

Source material

External links
 

Youth organizations established in 1931
Organisations based in Stirling (council area)
Tourism in Scotland
Hostelling International member associations
Walking in the United Kingdom
1931 establishments in Scotland
Charities based in Scotland
Youth charities based in the United Kingdom